Corporal Rod Webb and his faithful dog Chinook were the major characters in a series of films made by the American studio Monogram Pictures between 1949 and 1954. Webb was played by the actor Kirby Grant in eight films, while in two others (Trail of the Yukon and Snow Dog) Grant played the almost identical character of Bob McDonald, accompanied as usual by Chinook.

Corporal Webb was an officer of the Royal Canadian Mounted Police and enjoyed a series of adventures tracking down criminals in Yukon and the Northwest Territories. Chinook was his German Shepherd companion who, in spite of his name, had no connection to the Chinook breed of dog.

The series was based on the Northlands novels of James Oliver Curwood, and is part of the Northern genre of popular culture. The series bore similarities to a number of other films and shows, particularly to an earlier radio series Challenge of the Yukon and to the later television series Sergeant Preston of the Yukon.

Films
 Trail of the Yukon (1949)
 The Wolf Hunters (1949)
 Snow Dog (1950)
 Call of the Klondike (1950)
 Northwest Territory (1951)
 Yukon Manhunt (1951)
 Yukon Gold (1952)
 Fangs of the Arctic (1953)
 Northern Patrol (1953)
 Yukon Vengeance (1954)

Further reading
 Hollywood's Canada: The Americanization of Our National Image by Pierre Berton, McClelland and Stewart (1975)
 The Reel Cowboy: Essays on the Myth in Movies and Literature by Buck Rainey, McFarland & Co (1996)
 Canada and Canadians in Feature Films: A Filmography, 1928-1990 by Canadian Film Project (1996)
 Western Film Series of the Sound Era by Michael R. Pitts, McFarland & Co (2009)
 The Happiest Trails by John Brooker, Lulu (2017)

References

Bibliography
 Drew, Bernard. Motion Picture Series and Sequels: A Reference Guide. Routledge, 2013.

Film characters introduced in 1949
Film series introduced in 1949
American film series
Monogram Pictures films
Northern (genre) films
Royal Canadian Mounted Police in fiction
Corporal Rod Webb